La Butte may refer to:
 a lieu-dit in Ledringhem, Nord, France
 a place in Vix Grave, an archaeological site in Burgundy, France

See also 
 Butte (disambiguation)